Marcelo Figueras (born 1962 in Buenos Aires, Argentina) is a writer and a screenwriter.

Novels 
 El muchacho peronista
 El espía del tiempo, (2002)
 Kamchatka, 2003 (published in English in 2010 translated by Frank Wynne)
 La batalla del calentamiento, (2007)
 Aquarium (2009).

Filmography (Screenplays)
Rosario Tijeras (2005)
Peligrosa obsesión (2004)
Kamchatka (2002)
Plata quemada (2000) aka Burnt Money and Burning Money

Awards
Wins
 Cartagena Film Festival: Golden India Catalina Award; Best Screenplay for Kamchatka, 2003. 
 Argentine Film Critics Association Awards: Silver Condor Award; Best Adapted Screenplay, for Plata quemada, 2001.

Nominated
 Ariel Awards: Silver Ariel Award; Best Screenplay Adapted from Another Source, for Rosario Tijeras, Mexico, 2006.
 Argentine Film Critics Association Awards: Silver Condor Award; Best Original Screenplay, for Kamchatka, 2003.

Footnotes

External links
 
 

1962 births
Living people
Argentine male writers
Argentine screenwriters
Male screenwriters
People from Buenos Aires